The Steel Crown of King Carol I of the Romanians was forged at the Army Arsenal (Arsenalul Armatei) in Bucharest from the steel of a cannon captured by the Romanian Army from the Ottomans during its War of Independence. 

Carol I chose steel, and not gold, to symbolize the bravery of the Romanian soldiers. He received it during the ceremonies of his coronation and of the proclamation of Romania as a kingdom in 1881. It is the same Crown used in 1922 at the coronation of King Ferdinand I and Queen Maria as sovereigns of Romania, which took place in Alba-Iulia. The Crown was used also during the coronation and anointing as King of Michael I by the Orthodox Patriarch of Romania, Nicodim Munteanu, in the Patriarchal Cathedral of Bucharest, on the very day of his second accession, September 6, 1940. 

The coat of arms of Romania was augmented on 11 July 2016 to add a representation of the Steel Crown.

A copy of the crown was placed on the coffin of the last king of Romania, Michael I, during his funeral in December 2017.

Image gallery

References

External links
National History Museum of Romania
Presentation of the crown

Individual crowns
Regalia of Romania
National symbols of Romania